Gishu may refer to:
Gisu
Gīshu, a fictional character
Gishu, Hormozgan, a village in Iran
Gishu, Kerman, a village in Iran